Sattleria basistrigella is a moth in the family Gelechiidae. It was described by Peter Huemer in 1997. It is found in the Alps of Italy and Switzerland.

The length of the forewings is 8.2–10 mm for males and 5.5–7 mm for females. Adults are on wing from July to August.
The larvae feed on Silene acaulis. They live in a silken tube on the host plant.

References

Sattleria
Moths described in 1997